Ozan Çolakoğlu (born 1 April 1972) is a Turkish composer, songwriter and music producer; famous for his work with various Turkish pop singers and his multiple film scores. He co-founded the production company Sarı Ev (Yellow House), but left it in 2010 to work for dB Müzik.

Life and career
Ozan Çolakoğlu was born in Adana, Turkey in 1972. He attended the Berklee College of Music and his career started with Tarkan's first album called Yine Sensiz. Besides working continuously with the Turkish pop idol, he also contributed to the albums of such notable artists like Nil Karaibrahimgil, Murat Boz or the well known all-female Turkish rock band, Pin-up. In the music world he is also known for his remixes under the name Ozinga.

He arranged "Every Way That I Can", the song Sertab Erener won the Eurovision contest with. Years later, he would go on to arrange another Eurovision hit "Düm Tek Tek", written by his friend Sinan Akçıl.

Ozan Çolakoğlu is also credited for co-writing several of Tarkan's songs, including the second (European) version of "Şımarık".

Apart from Tarkan, he worked for Nilüfer (albums Karar Verdim and Hayal, single "Zalimin Kararı"), Bendeniz, Deniz Seki, Nil Karaibrahimgil, Ümit Sayın, Pınar Aylin, Gökçe, Yaşar, Çelik Erişçi, Özgün, Kızlar, Tan Taşçi (song "İşaret"), Sibel Can (song "Çantada Keklik"), Gülşen (complete album Önsöz).
His works include the scores of such popular movies like G.O.R.A., Sınav or Organize İşler.

Discography 
Studio albums
 01 (2012) (sales: 72,998)

Collaborations with other artists

Albums

Singles

Remixes

Film scores

References

External links
 Ozan Çolakoğlu official website
 dB Müzik
 Sarı Ev official website

Turkish film score composers
Turkish songwriters
Turkish record producers
1972 births
Living people